Plotnick and Plotnik are Russian-language occupational surnames literally meaning "carpenter" in Russian. The surname may refer to:

Plotnick
Jack Plotnick, American film and television actor, writer, and producer
Danny Plotnick, American independent filmmaker

Plotnik
Joel Plotnik, drummer with the American indie electro-pop band Monarch
Ravid Plotnik, Israeli singer and rapper
Robert Plotnik, American record-shop owner

Occupational surnames

Russian-language surnames